Bus is a commune in the Pas-de-Calais department in the Hauts-de-France region in northern France.

Geography
A small farming village located 22 miles (35 km) southeast of Arras on the D19 road, at the junction with the D7E. The A2 autoroute passes by just yards from the commune.

Population

Sights
 The church of Notre-Dame, dating from the twentieth century.

See also
Communes of the Pas-de-Calais department

References

External links

 Bus on the Quid website 

Communes of Pas-de-Calais